Andressa Wendel Jardim (born ) is a Brazilian individual rhythmic gymnast. She represents her nation at international competitions. She competed at world championships, including at the 2014 World Rhythmic Gymnastics Championships.

References

1998 births
Living people
Brazilian rhythmic gymnasts
Place of birth missing (living people)
South American Games bronze medalists for Brazil
South American Games medalists in gymnastics
Competitors at the 2014 South American Games
21st-century Brazilian women